Farciennes is a municipality of Wallonia located in the province of Hainaut, Belgium.

On January 1, 2018, Farciennes had a total population of 11,247. The total area is 10.39 km2 which gives a population density of 1,083 inhabitants per km2.  It is located on the entre-Sambre-et-Meuse in the periphery of Charleroi.

The municipality consists of the following districts: Farciennes and Pironchamps. The boroughs of Wainage, Wairchat and Tergnée are part of the district of Farciennes.

In the past, Farciennes was an industrial city. It declined with the closure of the last Walloon coal mine, namely the Sainte-Catherine shaft of the Roton company, and the fall of the iron and steel industries, formerly large employers in the area between Liège and Charleroi. Today, the site of Roton, of which only the tower and the cloakroom remain, has been developed to accommodate small and medium-sized businesses.

Notable people 
 Olivier Carette, footballer
 Laurent Ciman, footballer

See also
Municipalities of Belgium
Communities, regions and provinces of Belgium

References

External links
 

Municipalities of Hainaut (province)